Andrew Jackson Yorty (January 4, 1832 – February 20, 1886) was an American politician and businessman.

Born in Meadville, Pennsylvania, Yorty moved to the Town of Clinton, Wisconsin Territory in 1844 and then to the Town of Metomen, Wisconsin Territory living in Brandon, Wisconsin. Yorty went to California in 1855 and returned in 1861. He was in the hardware and lumber business. Yorty was chairman of the Metomen Town Board. In 1872, Yorty served in the Wisconsin State Assembly as a Republican. He died in Brandon in 1886.

References

External links
 

1832 births
1886 deaths
People from Meadville, Pennsylvania
People from Fond du Lac County, Wisconsin
Businesspeople from Wisconsin
Mayors of places in Wisconsin
Republican Party members of the Wisconsin State Assembly
19th-century American politicians
People from Brandon, Wisconsin
People from Clinton, Rock County, Wisconsin
19th-century American businesspeople